Beat The Chef is a television show shown on ABC-TV in Australia. It is a part game show part cooking show where two contestants cook a meal out of strange ingredients within 25 minute time limit. This show was influenced by the world-popular Japanese cooking show Iron Chef.

The show was cancelled in 2006.

Australian Broadcasting Corporation original programming
Australian cooking television series
Cooking competitions in Australia